Acting Out may refer to:
 Acting out, a psychological term
 "Acting Out" (Will & Grace), an episode of Will & Grace
 Acting Out (book), a 2003 book by French philosopher Bernard Stiegler
 "Acting Out", a 2009 song by Ashley Tisdale from her album Guilty Pleasure